Kurebhar is a town in Sultanpur district of the Uttar Pradesh state in India. Kurebhar is 20 km north of district headquarters Sultanpur city.

Governance 

There is a police station in Kurebhar. Kurebhar is also a Block in Sultanpur district. Pin Code of Kurebhar is 228151.

Transport

By Road
Kurebhar is situated on NH-330 Ayodhya- Sultanpur road in Sultanpur, Uttar Pradesh. That's why it is well connected with nearby cities and towns. Sultanpur, Faizabad, Ayodhya, Amethi, Pratapgarh and Allahabad (Prayagraj) are well connected with Kurebhar, Sultanpur. And Haiderganj, Dhanpatganj, Chaure Bazar, Guptarganj, Semari, Bikapur  and Kadipur towns are also well connected with Kurebhar.

By Train
There is a Kurebhar railway station in the town itself.  Sultanpur junction, Faizabad Junction, Ayodhya Junction, Akbarpur Junction, Musafirkhana Pratapgarh Junction, Chaure Bazar Amethi and Prayagraj Junction are the nearby railway stations from Kurebhar, Sultanpur.

By Air
Ayodhya Airport (Ayodhya), Allahabad Airport (Allahabad) and Chaudhary Charan Singh Airport (Lucknow) are the nearby airports to reach Kurebhar, Sultanpur.

References 

Villages in Sultanpur district